Moonchild is the debut studio album by British solo artist Charlene Soraia. It was released on 21 November 2011 by Peacefrog Records. A cover of "Wherever You Will Go", by American rock band The Calling, acted as the album's lead single as 10 years old hit.

Singles
 "Wherever You Will Go" was released as the album's lead single on 30 September 2011. The song is a cover and was originally released by American rock band, The Calling. The version was used in a Twinings advert in the UK. It peaked at number 2 on the UK Songs Chart iTunes, number 3 on the UK Singles Chart and number 20 on the Irish Singles Chart.

Track listing

Chart performance

Release history

References

External links
 Official website
 Charlene Soraia on Facebook
 Charlene Soraia on Twitter
 Charlene Soraia's YouTube Channel

2011 debut albums
Charlene Soraia albums
Peacefrog Records albums